The India national ice hockey team is the national men's ice hockey team of India. They are controlled by the Ice Hockey Association of India and a member of the International Ice Hockey Federation (IIHF). India is currently not ranked in the IIHF World Ranking and has not entered in any World Championship tournaments or at any Olympic Games; they have only played in the Challenge Cup of Asia, a regional tournament for lower-tier hockey nations in Asia.

Like in almost every Asian country ice hockey is a minor sport in India, where the most popular sports are cricket and field hockey. This diverts athletic talent away from ice hockey, which contributes to a lack of success in ice hockey in the country. The national team has not been active since 2018.

History

Background of ice hockey in Ladakh

The history of ice hockey in India dates back almost 100 years, when ice hockey was a favourite pastime for the British in Shimla. The Shimla Ice Skating Club is still very active in promoting ice sports in India. In the early 1970s, the Ladakh Scouts, a battalion of the Indian Army posted in the high border regions, took up the game. The high Changthang Plateau's frozen streams and high altitude lakes make the region an ideal place to play ice hockey, and as a result, the game spread amongst the army. The game gained more widespread popularity exhibition matches began taking place in Leh in the winter. With little to do during the region's harsh winters, locals began to play on a small irrigation pond in Karzoo, Leh.

Ice hockey gear was not and is still not available to buy in Ladakh. The few locals who have contacts outside Ladakh have requested friends to get ice hockey skates. The Ladakh Scouts are well equipped as they get their gear through the army. The Jammu & Kashmir department of tourism also had a full set of equipment, but was reluctant to spare any.  The only place in India where ice sports equipment is readily available is Shimla, a small hill station in the northwestern part of India, where two Chinese brothers began making skates that are still used today.

Due to lack of accessible equipment, Ladakhis began to improvise, with the first teams obtaining ice skating blades from Shimla and nailing them to army ammunition boots. Roller skates and ground hockey sticks were also used. To create pucks, locals cut the thick, rubber heels of army boots into a rounded shape. Goalkeepers wore ground hockey pads but lacked helmets; neither helmets nor knee and elbow pads were used by other players. Despite injuries, due to this lack of protective gear, the game has continued to grow in popularity in the region.

Tournament record

Challenge Cup of Asia

All-time record against other national teams
Last match update: 29 March 2018

See also
 India men's national junior ice hockey team
 India men's national under-18 ice hockey team
 India women's national ice hockey team

References

External links
Ice Hockey Association of India
IIHF profile

National
National ice hockey teams in Asia
Ice hockey